Andrea Cecchi (born 23 March 1968) is an Italian former swimmer. He competed in two events at the 1992 Summer Olympics.

References

External links
 

1968 births
Living people
Italian male swimmers
Olympic swimmers of Italy
Swimmers at the 1992 Summer Olympics
People from Casale Monferrato
Mediterranean Games medalists in swimming
Swimmers at the 1987 Mediterranean Games
Swimmers at the 1991 Mediterranean Games
Mediterranean Games bronze medalists for Italy
Sportspeople from the Province of Alessandria
20th-century Italian people
21st-century Italian people